{{Infobox language
| name             = Albanian
| nativename       = 
| pronunciation    = 
| states           = 
 
| ethnicity        = Albanians
| speakers         = 6.1 million in the Balkans
| date             = 2017
| ref              = 
| familycolor      = Indo-European
| fam2             = Paleo-Balkan
| protoname        = Proto-Albanian
| dia1             = Gheg
| dia2             = Tosk
| dia3             = Arbëresh
| dia4             = Arvanitika
| dia5             = Upper Reka
| dia6             = Arbanasi
| dia7             = Istrian 
| script           = 
| nation           = 
| minority         = 

Albanian (endonym:   or  ) is an Indo-European language and an independent branch of that language family. It is spoken by the Albanians in the Balkans and by the Albanian diaspora, which is generally concentrated in the Americas, Europe and Oceania. With perhaps as many as 7.5 million speakers, it comprises an independent branch within the Indo-European languages and is not closely related to any other modern language.

Albanian was first attested in the 15th century and it is a descendant of one of the Paleo-Balkan languages of antiquity. For geographical and historical reasons, some modern historians and linguists believe that the Albanian language may have descended from a southern Illyrian dialect spoken in much the same region in classical times. Alternative hypotheses hold that Albanian may have descended from Dardanian, Thracian or Daco-Moesian, other ancient languages spoken farther east than Illyrian.
Too little is known of these languages to prove or disprove completely the various hypotheses.

The two main Albanian dialect groups (or varieties), Gheg and Tosk, are primarily distinguished by phonological differences and are mutually intelligible in their standard varieties, with Gheg spoken to the north and Tosk spoken to the south of the Shkumbin river. Their characteristics in the treatment of both native words and loanwords provide evidence that the split into the northern and the southern dialects occurred after Christianisation of the region (4th century AD), and most likely not later than the 5th–6th centuries AD, hence possibly occupying roughly their present area divided by the Shkumbin river since the Post-Roman and Pre-Slavic period, straddling the Jireček Line.

Centuries-old communities speaking Albanian dialects can be found scattered in Greece (the Arvanites and some communities in Epirus, Western Macedonia and Western Thrace), Croatia (the Arbanasi), Italy (the Arbëreshë) as well as in Romania, Turkey and Ukraine. Two varieties of the Tosk dialect, Arvanitika in Greece and Arbëresh in southern Italy, have preserved archaic elements of the language. Ethnic Albanians constitute a large diaspora, with many having long assimilated in different cultures and communities. Consequently, Albanian-speakers do not correspond to the total ethnic Albanian population, as many ethnic Albanians may identify as Albanian but are unable to speak the language.

Standard Albanian is a standardised form of spoken Albanian based on Tosk. It is the official language of Albania and Kosovo, a co-official language in North Macedonia and Montenegro, as well as a minority language of Italy, Croatia, Romania and Serbia.

Geographic distribution

The language is spoken by approximately 6 million people in the Balkans, primarily in Albania, Kosovo, North Macedonia, Serbia, Montenegro and Greece. However, due to old communities in Italy and the large Albanian diaspora, the worldwide total of speakers is much higher than in Southern Europe and numbers approximately 7.5 million.

Europe

The Albanian language is the official language of Albania and Kosovo and co-official in North Macedonia and Montenegro. Albanian is a recognised minority language in Croatia, Italy, Romania and in Serbia. Albanian is also spoken by a minority in Greece, specifically in the Thesprotia and Preveza regional units and in a few villages in Ioannina and Florina regional units in Greece. It is also spoken by 450,000 Albanian immigrants in Greece, making it one of the commonly spoken languages in the country after Greek.

Albanian is the third most common mother tongue among foreign residents in  Italy. This is due to a substantial Albanian immigration to Italy. Italy has a historical Albanian minority of about 500,000, scattered across southern Italy, known as Arbëreshë. Approximately 1 million Albanians from Kosovo are dispersed throughout Germany, Switzerland and Austria. These are mainly immigrants from Kosovo who migrated during the 1990s. In Switzerland, the Albanian language is the sixth most spoken language with 176,293 native speakers.

Albanian became an official language in North Macedonia on 15 January 2019.

Americas
There are large numbers of Albanian speakers in the United States, Argentina, Chile, Uruguay, and Canada. Some of the first ethnic Albanians to arrive in the United States were the Arbëreshë. The Arbëreshë have a strong sense of identity and are unique in that they speak an archaic dialect of Tosk Albanian called Arbëresh.

In the United States and Canada, there are approximately 250,000 Albanian speakers. It is primarily spoken on the East Coast of the United States, in cities like New York City, Boston, Chicago, Philadelphia, and Detroit, as well as in parts of the states of New Jersey, Ohio, and Connecticut.

In Argentina, there are nearly 40,000 Albanian speakers, mostly in Buenos Aires.

Asia and Africa
Approximately 1.3 million people of Albanian ancestry live in Turkey, with more than 500,000 recognising their ancestry, language and culture. There are other estimates, however, that place the number of people in Turkey with Albanian ancestry and or background upward to 5 million. However, the vast majority of this population is assimilated and no longer possesses fluency in the Albanian language, though a vibrant Albanian community maintains its distinct identity in Istanbul to this day.

In Egypt, there are around 18,000 Albanians, mostly Tosk speakers. Many are descendants of the Janissary of Muhammad Ali Pasha, an Albanian who became Wāli, and self-declared Khedive of Egypt and Sudan. In addition to the dynasty that he established, a large part of the former Egyptian and Sudanese aristocracy was of Albanian origin. In addition to the recent emigrants, there are older diasporic communities around the world.

Oceania
Albanian is also spoken by Albanian diaspora communities residing in Australia and New Zealand.

Dialects 

The Albanian language has two distinct dialects, Tosk which is spoken in the south, and Gheg spoken in the north. Standard Albanian is based on the Tosk dialect. The Shkumbin River is the rough dividing line between the two dialects.

Gheg is divided into four sub-dialects: Northwest Gheg, Northeast Gheg, Central Gheg and Southern Gheg. It is primarily spoken in northern Albania, Kosovo, and throughout Montenegro and northwestern North Macedonia. One fairly divergent dialect is the Upper Reka dialect, which is however classified as Central Gheg. There is also a diaspora dialect in Croatia, the Arbanasi dialect.

Tosk is divided into five sub-dialects, including Northern Tosk (the most numerous in speakers), Labërisht, Cham, Arvanitika, and Arbëresh. Tosk is spoken in southern Albania, southwestern North Macedonia and northern and southern Greece. Cham Albanian is spoken in North-western Greece, while Arvanitika is spoken by the Arvanites in southern Greece. In addition, Arbëresh is spoken by the Arbëreshë people, descendants of 15th and 16th century migrants who settled in southeastern Italy, in small communities in the regions of Sicily and Calabria. These settlements originated from the (Arvanites) communities probably of Peloponnese known as Morea in the Middle Ages. Among them the Arvanites call themselves Arbëror and sometime Arbëresh. The Arbëresh dialect is closely related to the Arvanites dialect with more Italian vocabulary absorbed during different periods of time.

Orthography 

The Albanian language has been written using many alphabets since the earliest records from the 15th century. The history of Albanian language orthography is closely related to the cultural orientation and knowledge of certain foreign languages among Albanian writers. The earliest written Albanian records come from the Gheg area in makeshift spellings based on Italian or Greek. Originally, the Tosk dialect was written in the Greek alphabet and the Gheg dialect was written in the Latin script. Both dialects had also been written in the Ottoman Turkish version of the Arabic script, Cyrillic, and some local alphabets (Elbasan, Vithkuqi, Todhri, Veso Bey, Jan Vellara and others, see original Albanian alphabets). More specifically, the writers from northern Albania and under the influence of the Catholic Church used Latin letters, those in southern Albania and under the influence of the Greek Orthodox church used Greek letters, while others throughout Albania and under the influence of Islam used Arabic letters. There were initial attempts to create an original Albanian alphabet during the 1750–1850 period. These attempts intensified after the League of Prizren and culminated with the Congress of Manastir held by Albanian intellectuals from 14 to 22 November 1908, in Manastir (present day Bitola), which decided on which alphabet to use, and what the standardised spelling would be for standard Albanian. This is how the literary language remains. The alphabet is the Latin alphabet with the addition of the letters <ë>, <ç>, and ten digraphs: dh, th, xh, gj, nj, ng, ll, rr, zh and sh.

According to Robert Elsie:
The hundred years between 1750 and 1850 were an age of astounding orthographic diversity in Albania. In this period, the Albanian language was put to writing in at least ten different alphabets – most certainly a record for European languages. ... the diverse forms in which this old Balkan language was recorded, from the earliest documents to the beginning of the twentieth century ... consist of adaptations of the Latin, Greek, Arabic, and Cyrillic alphabets and (what is even more interesting) a number of locally invented writing systems. Most of the latter alphabets have now been forgotten and are unknown, even to the Albanians themselves.

Classification 

Albanian constitutes one of the eleven major branches of the Indo-European language family, within which it occupies an independent position. In 1854, Albanian was demonstrated to be an Indo-European language by the philologist Franz Bopp. Albanian was formerly compared by a few Indo-European linguists with Germanic and Balto-Slavic, all of which share a number of isoglosses with Albanian. Other linguists linked the Albanian language with Latin, Greek and Armenian, while placing Germanic and Balto-Slavic in another branch of Indo-European. In current scholarship there is evidence that Albanian is closely related to Greek and Armenian, while the fact that it is a satem language is less significant.

The hypothesis of the "Balkan Indo-European" continuum posits a common period of prehistoric coexistence of several Indo-European dialects in the Balkans prior to 2000 BC. To this group would belong Albanian, Ancient Greek, Armenian, Phrygian, fragmentary attested languages such as Macedonian, Thracian, or Illyrian, and the relatively well-attested Messapic in Southern Italy. The common features of this group appear at the phonological, morphological, and lexical levels, presumably resulting from the contact between the various languages. The concept of this linguistic group is explained as a kind of language league of the Bronze Age (a specific areal-linguistics phenomenon), although it also consisted of languages that were related to each other. A common prestage posterior to PIE comprising Albanian, Greek, and Armenian, is considered as a possible scenario. In this light, due to the larger number of possible shared innovations between Greek and Armenian, it appears reasonable to assume, at least tentatively, that Albanian was the first Balkan IE language to branch off. This split and the following ones were perhaps very close in time, allowing only a narrow time frame for shared innovations.

Albanian represents one of the core languages of the Balkan Sprachbund.

Glottolog and Ethnologue recognize four Albanian languages. They are classified as follows:

 Indo-European
 Paleo-Balkan
 Albanian
 Albanian-Tosk
 Arbëreshë Albanian
 Arvanitika Albanian
 Northern Tosk Albanian
 Gheg Albanian

History

Historical documentation 
The first attested written mention of the Albanian language was on 14 July 1284 in Ragusa in modern Croatia (Dubrovnik) when a crime witness named Matthew testified: "I heard a voice crying on the mountain in the Albanian language".

The Albanian language is also mentioned in the Descriptio Europae Orientalis dated in 1308:Habent enim Albani prefati linguam distinctam a Latinis, Grecis et Sclauis ita quod in nullo se intelligunt cum aliis nationibus.

(Namely, the above-mentioned Albanians have a language that is different from the languages of Latins, Greeks and Slavs, so that they do not understand each other at all.)The oldest attested document written in Albanian dates back to 1462, while the first audio recording in the language was made by Norbert Jokl on 4 April 1914 in Vienna.

However, as Fortson notes, Albanian written works existed before this point; they have simply been lost. The existence of written Albanian is explicitly mentioned in a letter attested from 1332, and the first preserved books, including both those in Gheg and in Tosk, share orthographic features that indicate that some form of common literary language had developed.

During the five-century period of the Ottoman presence in Albania, the language was not officially recognised until 1909, when the Congress of Dibra decided that Albanian schools would finally be allowed.

Linguistic affinities 

Albanian is considered an isolate within the Indo-European language family; no other language has been conclusively linked to its branch. The only other languages that are the sole surviving members of a branch of Indo-European are Armenian and Greek.

The Albanian language is part of the Indo-European language group and is considered to have evolved from one of the Paleo-Balkan languages of antiquity, 
although it is still uncertain which particular Paleo-Balkan language represents the ancestor of Albanian, or where in southern Europe that population lived. In general there is insufficient evidence to connect Albanian with one of those languages, whether one of the Illyrian languages or Thracian and Dacian. Among these possibilities, Illyrian is typically held to be the most probable, though insufficient evidence still clouds the discussion.

Although Albanian shares lexical isoglosses with Greek, Germanic, and to a lesser extent Balto-Slavic, the vocabulary of Albanian is quite distinct. In 1995, Taylor, Ringe and Warnow, using quantitative linguistic techniques, found that Albanian appears to comprise a "subgroup with Germanic". However, they argued that this fact is hardly significant, as Albanian has lost much of its original vocabulary and morphology, and so this "apparently close connection to Germanic rests on only a couple of lexical cognates – hardly any evidence at all".

Historical presence and location 

The place and the time that the Albanian language was formed are uncertain. American linguist Eric Hamp stated that during an unknown chronological period a pre-Albanian population (termed as "Albanoid" by Hamp) inhabited areas stretching from Poland to the southwestern Balkans. Further analysis has suggested that it was in a mountainous region rather than on a plain or seacoast. The words for plants and animals characteristic of mountainous regions are entirely original, but the names for fish and for agricultural activities (such as ploughing) are borrowed from other languages.

A deeper analysis of the vocabulary, however, shows that could be a consequence of a prolonged Latin domination of the coastal and plain areas of the country, rather than evidence of the original environment in which the Albanian language was formed. For example, the word for 'fish' is borrowed from Latin, but not the word for 'gills' which is native. Indigenous are also the words for 'ship', 'raft', 'navigation', 'sea shelves' and a few names of fish kinds, but not the words for 'sail', 'row' and 'harbor'; objects pertaining to navigation itself and a large part of sea fauna. This rather shows that Proto-Albanians were pushed away from coastal areas in early times (probably after the Latin conquest of the region) and thus lost a large amount (or the majority) of their sea environment lexicon. A similar phenomenon could be observed with agricultural terms. While the words for 'arable land', 'corn', 'wheat', 'cereals', 'vineyard', 'yoke', 'harvesting', 'cattle breeding', etc. are native, the words for 'ploughing', 'farm' and 'farmer', agricultural practices, and some harvesting tools are foreign. This, again, points to intense contact with other languages and people, rather than providing evidence of a possible linguistic homeland (also known as a Urheimat).

The centre of Albanian settlement remained the Mat River. In 1079, the Albanians were recorded farther south in the valley of the Shkumbin River. The Shkumbin, a seasonal stream that lies near the old Via Egnatia, is approximately the boundary of the primary dialect division for Albanian, Tosk and Gheg. The characteristics of Tosk and Gheg in the treatment of the native words and loanwords from other languages are evidence that the dialectal split preceded the Slavic migration to the Balkans, which means that in that period (the 5th to 6th centuries AD), Albanians were occupying nearly the same area around the Shkumbin river, which straddled the Jireček Line.

References to the existence of Albanian as a distinct language survive from the 14th century, but they failed to cite specific words. The oldest surviving documents written in Albanian are the "formula e pagëzimit" (Baptismal formula), Un'te paghesont' pr'emenit t'Atit e t'Birit e t'Spertit Senit. ("I baptize thee in the name of the Father, and the Son, and the Holy Spirit") recorded by Pal Engjelli, Bishop of Durrës in 1462 in the Gheg dialect, and some New Testament verses from that period.

The linguists Stefan Schumacher and Joachim Matzinger (University of Vienna) assert that the first literary records of Albanian date from the 16th century. The oldest known Albanian printed book, Meshari, or "missal", was written in 1555 by Gjon Buzuku, a Roman Catholic cleric. In 1635, Frang Bardhi wrote the first Latin–Albanian dictionary. The first Albanian school is believed to have been opened by Franciscans in 1638 in Pdhanë.

One of the earliest Albanian dictionaries was written in 1693; it was the Italian manuscript Pratichae Schrivaneschae authored by the Montenegrin sea captain Julije Balović and includes a multilingual dictionary of hundreds of the most frequently used words in everyday life in Italian, Slavic, Greek, Albanian, and Turkish.

Pre-Indo-European substratum
Pre-Indo-European (PreIE) sites are found throughout the territory of Albania. Such PreIE sites existed in Maliq, Vashtëm, Burimas, Barç, Dërsnik in the Korçë District, Kamnik in Kolonja, Kolsh in the Kukës District, Rashtan in Librazhd, and Nezir in the Mat District. As in other parts of Europe, these PreIE people joined the migratory Indo-European tribes that entered the Balkans and contributed to the formation of the historical Paleo-Balkan tribes. In terms of linguistics, the pre-Indo-European substrate language spoken in the southern Balkans probably influenced pre-Proto-Albanian, the ancestor idiom of Albanian. The extent of this linguistic impact cannot be determined with precision due to the uncertain position of Albanian among Paleo-Balkan languages and their scarce attestation. Some loanwords, however, have been proposed, such as shegë 'pomegranate' or lëpjetë 'orach'; compare Pre-Greek λάπαθον, lápathon 'monk's rhubarb').

Proto-IE features 
Although Albanian has many words that do not correspond to IE cognates, it has retained many proto-IE features: for example, the demonstrative pronoun *ḱi- is ancestral to Albanian ky/kjo, English he, and Russian sej but not to English this or Russian etot.

Albanian is compared to other Indo-European languages below, but note that Albanian has exhibited some notable instances of semantic drift, such as motër meaning "sister" rather than "mother".

Albanian–PIE phonological correspondences 
Phonologically, Albanian is not so conservative. Like many IE stocks, it has merged the two series of voiced stops (e.g. both *d and *dʰ became d). In addition, voiced stops tend to disappear in between vowels. There is almost complete loss of final syllables and very widespread loss of other unstressed syllables (e.g. mik 'friend' from Lat. amicus). PIE *o appears as a (also as e if a high front vowel i follows), while *ē and *ā become o, and PIE *ō appears as e.

The palatals, velars, and labiovelars show distinct developments, with Albanian showing the three-way distinction also found in Luwian. Labiovelars are for the most part differentiated from all other Indo-European velar series before front vowels, but they merge with the "pure" (back) velars elsewhere. The palatal velar series, consisting of Proto-Indo-European *ḱ and the merged *ģ and ģʰ, usually developed into th and dh, but were depalatalised to merge with the back velars when in contact with sonorants. Because the original Proto-Indo-European tripartite distinction between dorsals is preserved in such reflexes, Albanian is therefore neither centum nor satem, despite having a "satem-like" realization of the palatal dorsals in most cases. Thus PIE *ḱ, *k, and *kʷ become th, q, and s, respectively (before back vowels *ḱ becomes th, while *k and *kʷ merge as k).

A minority of scholars reconstruct a fourth laryngeal *h4 allegedly surfacing as Alb. h word-initially, e.g. Alb. herdhe 'testicles' presumably from PIE *h4órǵʰi- (rather than the usual reconstruction *h3erǵʰi-), but this is generally not followed elsewhere, as h- has arisen elsewhere idiosyncratically (for example hark < Latin arcus).

Standard Albanian 
Since World War II, standard Albanian used in Albania has been based on the Tosk dialect. Kosovo and other areas where Albanian is official adopted the Tosk standard in 1969.

Elbasan-based standard 
Until the early 20th century, Albanian writing developed in three main literary traditions: Gheg, Tosk, and Arbëreshë. Throughout this time, a Geg subdialect spoken around Elbasan served as lingua franca among the Albanians, but was less prevalent in writing. The Congress of Manastir of Albanian writers held in 1908 recommended the use of the Elbasan subdialect for literary purposes and as a basis of a unified national language. While technically classified as a southern Gheg variety, the Elbasan speech is closer to Tosk in phonology and practically a hybrid between other Gheg subdialects and literary Tosk.

Between 1916 and 1918, the Albanian Literary Commission met in Shkodër under the leadership of Luigj Gurakuqi with the purpose of establishing a unified orthography for the language. The commission, made up of representatives from the north and south of Albania, reaffirmed the Elbasan subdialect as the basis of a national tongue. The rules published in 1917 defined spelling for the Elbasan variety for official purposes. The commission did not, however, discourage publications in one of the dialects, but rather laid a foundation for Gheg and Tosk to gradually converge into one.

When the Congress of Lushnje met in the aftermath of World War I to form a new Albanian government, the 1917 decisions of the Literary Commission were upheld. The Elbasan subdialect remained in use for administrative purposes and many new writers embraced it for creative writing. Gheg and Tosk continued to develop freely and interaction between the two dialects increased.

Tosk standard 
At the end of World War II, however, the new communist regime radically imposed the use of the Tosk dialect in all facets of life in Albania: administration, education, and literature. Most Communist leaders were Tosks from the south. Standardisation was directed by the Albanian Institute of Linguistics and Literature of the Academy of Sciences of Albania. Two dictionaries were published in 1954: an Albanian language dictionary and a Russian–Albanian dictionary. New orthography rules were eventually published in 1967 and in 1973 with the Drejtshkrimi i gjuhës shqipe (Orthography of the Albanian Language).

Until 1968, Kosovo and other Albanian-speaking areas in Yugoslavia followed the 1917 standard based on the Elbasan dialect, though it was gradually infused with Gheg elements in an effort to develop a Kosovan language separate from communist Albania's Tosk-based standard. Albanian intellectuals in the former Yugoslavia consolidated the 1917 standard twice in the 1950s, culminating with a thorough codification of orthographic rules in 1964. The rules already provided for a balanced variety that accounted for both Gheg and Tosk dialects, but only lasted through 1968. Viewing divergences with Albania as a threat to their identity, Kosovars arbitrarily adopted the Tosk project that Tirana had published the year before. Although it was never intended to serve outside of Albania, the project became the "unified literary language" in 1972, when approved by a rubberstamp Orthography Congress. Only about 1 in 9 participants were from Kosovo. The Congress, held at Tirana, authorized the orthography rules that came out the following year, in 1973.

More recent dictionaries from the Albanian government are Fjalori Drejtshkrimor i Gjuhës Shqipe (1976) (Orthographic Dictionary of the Albanian Language) and Dictionary of Today's Albanian language (Fjalori i Gjuhës së Sotme Shqipe) (1980). Prior to World War II, dictionaries consulted by developers of the standard have included Lexikon tis Alvanikis glossis (Albanian: Fjalori i Gjuhës Shqipe (Kostandin Kristoforidhi, 1904), Fjalori i Bashkimit (1908), and Fjalori i Gazullit (1941).

Calls for reform 
Since the fall of the communist regime, Albanian orthography has stirred heated debate among scholars, writers, and public opinion in Albania and Kosovo, with hardliners opposed to any changes in the orthography, moderates supporting varying degrees of reform, and radicals calling for a return to the Elbasan dialect. Criticism of Standard Albanian has centred on the exclusion of the 'me + participle' infinitive and the Gheg lexicon. Critics say that Standard Albanian disenfranchises and stigmatises Gheg speakers, affecting the quality of writing and impairing effective public communication. Supporters of the Tosk standard view the 1972 Congress as a milestone achievement in Albanian history and dismiss calls for reform as efforts to "divide the nation" or "create two languages." Moderates, who are especially prevalent in Kosovo, generally stress the need for a unified Albanian language, but believe that the 'me + participle' infinitive and Gheg words should be included. Proponents of the Elbasan dialect have been vocal, but have gathered little support in the public opinion. In general, those involved in the language debate come from diverse backgrounds and there is no significant correlation between one's political views, geographic origin, and position on Standard Albanian.

Many writers continue to write in the Elbasan dialect but other Gheg variants have found much more limited use in literature. Most publications adhere to a strict policy of not accepting submissions that are not written in Tosk. Some print media even translate direct speech, replacing the 'me + participle' infinitive with other verb forms and making other changes in grammar and word choice. Even authors who have published in the Elbasan dialect will frequently write in the Tosk standard.

In 2013, a group of academics for Albania and Kosovo proposed minor changes to the orthography. Hardline academics boycotted the initiative, while other reformers have viewed it as well-intentioned but flawed and superficial.

Education 
Albanian is the medium of instruction in most Albanian schools. The literacy rate in Albania for the total population, age 9 or older, is about 99%. Elementary education is compulsory (grades 1–9), but most students continue at least until a secondary education. Students must pass graduation exams at the end of the 9th grade and at the end of the 12th grade in order to continue their education.

Phonology 
Standard Albanian has seven vowels and 29 consonants.

Gheg uses long and nasal vowels, which are absent in Tosk, and the mid-central vowel ë is lost at the end of the word. The stress is fixed mainly on the last syllable. Gheg n (femën: compare English feminine) changes to r by rhotacism in Tosk (femër).

Consonants 

Notes:

 The contrast between flapped r and trilled rr is the almost the same as in Spanish or Armenian.  However, in most of the dialects, as also in standard Albanian, the single "r" changes from an alveolar flap  to an alveolar approximant .
 The palatal nasal  corresponds to the Spanish ñ and the French and Italian gn. It is pronounced as one sound, not a nasal plus a glide.
 The ll sound is a velarised lateral, close to English dark l.
 The letter ç is sometimes written ch due to technical limitations, in analogy to the other digraphs xh, sh, and zh. Usually it is written simply c or more rarely q with context resolving any ambiguities.
 The sounds spelled with q and gj show variation. They may range between occurring as palatal affricates  or as palatal stops  among dialects. Some speakers merge them into the palatoalveolar sounds ç and xh. This is especially common in Northern Gheg, but is increasingly the case in Tosk as well. Other speakers reduced them into  in consonant clusters, such as in the word fjollë, which before standardisation was written as fqollë ( < Medieval Greek φακιολης). 
 Before q and gj,  n is always pronounced  but this is not reflected in the orthography.
  are interdental.

Vowels

Notes 
 ë can also range to an open-mid sound  in the Northern Tosk dialect.
 Mid sounds  can also be heard as more open-mid sounds , in free variation.

Schwa 
The schwa in Albanian has a great degree of variability from extreme back to extreme front articulation. Although the Indo-European schwa (ə or -h2-) was preserved in Albanian, in some cases it was lost, possibly when a stressed syllable preceded it. Until the standardisation of the modern Albanian alphabet, in which the schwa is spelled as ë, as in the work of Gjon Buzuku in the 16th century, various vowels and gliding vowels were employed, including ae by Lekë Matrënga and é by Pjetër Bogdani in the late 16th and early 17th century. Within the borders of Albania, the phoneme is pronounced about the same in both the Tosk and the Gheg dialect due to the influence of standard Albanian. However, in the Gheg dialects spoken in the neighbouring Albanian-speaking areas of Kosovo and North Macedonia, the phoneme is still pronounced as back and rounded.

Grammar 

Albanian has a canonical word order of SVO (subject–verb–object) like English and many other Indo-European languages. Albanian nouns are categorised by gender (masculine, feminine and neuter) and inflected for number (singular and plural) and case. There are five declensions and six cases (nominative, accusative, genitive, dative, ablative, and vocative), although the vocative only occurs with a limited number of words (such as 'bir' ("son"), vocative case: biro, zog ("bird") vocative case: zogo), and the forms of the genitive and dative are identical (a genitive construction employs the prepositions i/e/të/së alongside dative morphemes). Some dialects also retain a locative case, which is not present in standard Albanian (e.g. "në malt" loc.sg.def). The cases apply to both definite and indefinite nouns, and there are numerous cases of syncretism.

The following shows the declension of mal (mountain), a masculine noun which takes "i" in the definite singular:

The following shows the declension of the masculine noun zog (bird), a masculine noun which takes "u" in the definite singular:

The following table shows the declension of the feminine noun vajzë (girl):

The definite article is placed after the noun as in many other Balkan languages, like in Romanian, Macedonian and Bulgarian.

 The definite article can be in the form of noun suffixes, which vary with gender and case.
 For example, in singular nominative, masculine nouns add -i, or those ending in -g/-k/-h take -u (to avoid palatalization):
mal (mountain) / mali (the mountain);
 libër (book) / libri (the book);
 zog (bird) / zogu (the bird).
 Feminine nouns take the suffix -(i/j)a:
 veturë (car) / vetura (the car);
 shtëpi (house) / shtëpia (the house);
 lule (flower) / lulja (the flower).
 Neuter nouns take -t.

Albanian has developed an analytical verbal structure in place of the earlier synthetic system, inherited from Proto-Indo-European. Its complex system of moods (six types) and tenses (three simple and five complex constructions) is distinctive among Balkan languages. There are two general types of conjugations.

Albanian verbs, like those of other Balkan languages, have an "admirative" mood (mënyra habitore) that is used to indicate surprise on the part of the speaker or to imply that an event is known to the speaker by report and not by direct observation. In some contexts, this mood can be translated using English "apparently".

 Ti flet shqip. "You speak Albanian." (indicative)
 Ti folke shqip! "You (surprisingly) speak Albanian!" (admirative)
 Rruga është e mbyllur. "The street is closed." (indicative)
 Rruga qenka e mbyllur. "(Apparently,) The street is closed." (admirative)

For more information on verb conjugation and on inflection of other parts of speech, see Albanian morphology.

Word order 
Albanian word order is relatively free. To say 'Agim ate all the oranges' in Albanian, one may use any of the following orders, with slight pragmatic differences:

 SVO: Agimi i hëngri të gjithë portokallët.
 SOV: Agimi të gjithë portokallët i hëngri.
 OVS: Të gjithë portokallët i hëngri Agimi.
 OSV: Të gjithë portokallët Agimi i hëngri.
 VSO: I hëngri Agimi të gjithë portokallët.
 VOS: I hëngri të gjithë portokallët Agimi.

However, the most common order is subject–verb–object.

The verb can optionally occur in sentence-initial position, especially with verbs in the non-active form (forma joveprore):

 Parashikohet një ndërprerje "An interruption is anticipated".

Negation 
Verbal negation in Albanian is mood-dependent, a trait shared with some fellow Indo-European languages such as Greek.

In indicative, conditional, or admirative sentences, negation is expressed by the particles nuk or s''' in front of the verb, for example:

 Toni nuk flet anglisht "Tony does not speak English";
 Toni s'flet anglisht "Tony doesn't speak English";
 Nuk e di "I do not know";
 S'e di "I don't know".

Subjunctive, imperative, optative, or non-finite forms of verbs are negated with the particle mos:

 Mos harro "do not forget!".

 Numerals 

 Vigesimal system 
However the system has been lost in the standard language (excluding the dialects) due to the long-lasting Latin influence in Antiquity and in the Middle Ages. Albanian is the only Balkan language that has preserved the Pre-Indo-European vigesimal system.

 Literary tradition 

 Earliest undisputed texts 

The earliest known texts in Albanian:
 the "formula e pagëzimit" (Baptismal Formula), which dates back to 1462 and was authored by Pal Engjëlli (or Paulus Angelus) (c. 1417 – 1470), Archbishop of Durrës. Engjëlli was a close friend and counsellor of Skanderbeg. It was written in a pastoral letter for a synod at the Holy Trinity in Mat and read in Latin characters as follows: Unte paghesont premenit Atit et Birit et Spertit Senit (standard Albanian: "Unë të pagëzoj në emër të Atit, të Birit e të Shpirtit të Shenjtë"; English: "I baptise you in the name of the Father and the Son and the Holy Spirit"). It was discovered and published in 1915 by Nicolae Iorga.
 the Fjalori i Arnold von Harfit (Arnold Ritter von Harff's lexicon), a short list of Albanian phrases with German glosses, dated 1496.
 a song, recorded in the Greek alphabet, retrieved from an old codex that was written in Greek. The document is also called "Perikopeja e Ungjillit të Pashkëve" or "Perikopeja e Ungjillit të Shën Mateut" ("The Song of the Easter Gospel, or "The Song of Saint Matthew's Gospel"). Although the codex is dated to during the 14th century, the song, written in Albanian by an anonymous writer, seems to be a 16th-century writing. The document was found by Arbëreshë people who had emigrated to Italy in the 15th century.
 The first book in Albanian is the Meshari ("The Missal"), written by Gjon Buzuku between 20 March 1554 and 5 January 1555. The book was written in the Gheg dialect in the Latin script with some Slavic letters adapted for Albanian vowels. The book was discovered in 1740 by Gjon Nikollë Kazazi, the Albanian archbishop of Skopje. It contains the liturgies of the main holidays. There are also texts of prayers and rituals and catechetical texts. The grammar and the vocabulary are more archaic than those in the Gheg texts from the 17th century. The 188 pages of the book comprise about 154,000 words with a total vocabulary of c. 1,500 different words. The text is archaic yet easily interpreted because it is mainly a translation of known texts, in particular portions of the Bible. The book also contains passages from the Psalms, the Book of Isaiah, the Book of Jeremiah, the Letters to the Corinthians, and many illustrations. The uniformity of spelling seems to indicate an earlier tradition of writing. The only known copy of the Meshari is held by the Apostolic Library. In 1968 the book was published with transliterations and comments by linguists.
 The first printed work in Tosk Albanian is the Mbsuame e krështerë (in Italian: Dottrina cristiana) by Lekë Matrënga or (in Italian) Luca Matranga. It was published in 1592 and is written in an early form of the Arbëresh language (also known as Italo-Albanian).

Albanian scripts were produced earlier than the first attested document, "formula e pagëzimit", but none yet have been discovered. We know of their existence by earlier references. For example, a French monk signed as "Broccardus" notes, in 1332, that "Although the Albanians have another language totally different from Latin, they still use Latin letters in all their books".

 Disputed earlier texts 

In 1967 two scholars claimed to have found a Letter text in Albanian inserted into the Bellifortis text, a book written in Latin dating to 1402–1405.

Dr. Robert Elsie, a specialist in Albanian studies, considers that "The Todericiu/Polena Romanian translation of the non-Latin lines, although it may offer some clues if the text is indeed Albanian, is fanciful and based, among other things, on a false reading of the manuscript, including the exclusion of a whole line."

 Ottoman period 
In 1635, Frang Bardhi (1606–1643) published in Rome his Dictionarum latinum-epiroticum, the first known Latin-Albanian dictionary. Other scholars who studied the language during the 17th century include Andrea Bogdani (1600–1685), author of the first Latin-Albanian grammar book, Nilo Katalanos (1637–1694) and others.

 Lexicon 

Albanian is known within historical linguistics as a case of a language which, although surviving through many periods of foreign rule and multilingualism, saw a "disproportionately high" influx of loans from other languages augmenting and replacing much of its original vocabulary. Of all the foreign influences in Albanian, the deepest reaching and most impactful was the absorption of loans from Latin in the Classical period and its Romance successors afterward, with over 60% of Albanian vocabulary consisting of Latin roots, causing Albanian to once have been mistakenly identified as a Romance language.

Major work in reconstructing Proto-Albanian has been done with the help of knowledge of the original forms of loans from Ancient Greek, Latin and Slavic, while Ancient Greek loanwords are scarce the Latin loanwords are of extreme importance in phonology. The presence of loanwords from more well-studied languages from time periods before Albanian was attested, reaching deep back into the Classical Era, has been of great use in phonological reconstructions for earlier ancient and medieval forms of Albanian.

Lexical distance of Albanian to other languages in a lexicostatistical analysis by Ukrainian linguist Tyshchenko shows the following results (the lower figure, the higher similarity): 49% Slovenian, 53% Romanian, 56% Greek, 82% French, 86% Macedonian, 86% Bulgarian.

 Cognates with Illyrian 

 Early linguistic influences 
The earliest loanwords attested in Albanian come from Doric Greek, whereas the strongest influence came from Latin. Some scholars argue that Albanian originated from an area located east of its present geographic spread due to the several common lexical items found between the Albanian and Romanian languages. However it does not necessarily define the genealogical history of Albanian language, and it does not exclude the possibility of Proto-Albanian presence in both Illyrian and Thracian territory.

The period during which Proto-Albanian and Latin interacted was protracted, lasting from the 2nd century BC to the 5th century AD. Over this period, the lexical borrowings can be roughly divided into three layers, the second of which is the largest. The first and smallest occurred at the time of less significant interaction. The final period, probably preceding the Slavic or Germanic invasions, also has a notably smaller number of borrowings. Each layer is characterised by a different treatment of most vowels: the first layer follows the evolution of Early Proto-Albanian into Albanian; while later layers reflect vowel changes endemic to Late Latin (and presumably Proto-Romance). Other formative changes include the syncretism of several noun case endings, especially in the plural, as well as a large-scale palatalisation.

A brief period followed, between the 7th and the 9th centuries, that was marked by heavy borrowings from South Slavic, some of which predate the "o-a" shift common to the modern forms of this language group. Starting in the latter 9th century, there was a period characterised by protracted contact with the Proto-Romanians (or "Vlachs"), though lexical borrowing seems to have been mostly one sided: from Albanian into Romanian. Such borrowing indicates that the Romanians migrated from an area where the majority was Slavic (i.e. Middle Bulgarian) to an area with a majority of Albanian speakers (i.e. Dardania, where Vlachs are recorded in the 10th century). Their movement is presumably related to the expansion of the Bulgarian Empire into Albania around that time.

 Early Greek loans 
There are some 30 Ancient Greek loanwords in Proto-Albanian. Many of these reflect a dialect which voiced its aspirants, as did the Macedonian dialect. Other loanwords are Doric; these words mainly refer to commodity items and trade goods and probably came through trade with a now-extinct intermediary.
 ; "sickle" < (Northwest Greek) 
 ; "hive, bee" < Attic  "bee" (vs. Ionic ).
 ; "plum" < 
 ; "cabbage, green vegetables" <  "green; vegetable"
 ; "orach, dock" < 
 ; "to smear, to oil"< Proto-Albanian *elaiwanja < *elaiwa (olive oil) < Greek elaion 
 ; "millstone" < (Northwest)  "device, instrument"
 ; "apple" <  "fruit"
 ; "palm of the hand" < 
 ; "melon" < 
 ; "leek" < 
 ; "thyme" < (Northwest) , 
 ; "pond, pool" <  "high sea"

According to Huld (1986), the following come from a Greek dialect without any significant attestation called "Makedonian" because it was akin to the native idiom of the Greek-speaking population in the Argead kingdom:
 ; "elbow" < * 
 ; "tamarisk" < *
 ; 'mallow' < * (with the reflex of /ɡ/ for Greek <χ> indicating a dialectal voicing of the what came as an aspirate stop from Greek) 
  "fennel" < * (cf Romanian , Ionic ; with the Albanian simplification of -dri̯- to -j- reflecting that of earlier * to  "water")

 Latin influence 

In total Latin roots comprise over 60% of the Albanian lexicon.

Jernej Kopitar (1780–1844) was the first to note Latin's influence on Albanian and claimed "the Latin loanwords in the Albanian language had the pronunciation of the time of Emperor Augustus". Gustav Meyer (1888) and Wilhelm Meyer-Lübke (1914) later corroborated this. Meyer noted the similarity between the Albanian verbs  "to speak clearly, enunciate" and  "to pronounce, articulate" and the Latin word  (meaning "to welcome"). Johann Georg von Hahn, an Austrian linguist, had proposed the same hypothesis in 1854.

Eqrem Çabej also noticed, among other things, the archaic Latin elements in Albanian:

 Latin /au/ becomes Albanian /a/ in the earliest loanwords:  →  'gold';  →  'joy';  →  'laurel'. Latin /au/ is retained in later loans, but is altered in a way similar to Greek:  'thing' →  'thing; beast, brute';  → .
 Latin /oː/ becomes Albanian /e/ in the oldest Latin loans:  →  'fruit tree';  →  'time, instance'. An analogous mutation occurred from Proto-Indo-European to Albanian; PIE  became Albanian  'we', PIE  + suffix -ti- became Albanian  'eight', etc.
 Latin unstressed internal and initial syllables become lost in Albanian:  →  'elbow';  →  'physician';  'swamp' → Vulgar Latin  →  'forest'. An analogous mutation occurred from Proto-Indo-European to Albanian. In contrast, in later Latin loanwords, the internal syllable is retained:  → ;  →  'wound', etc.
 Latin /tj/, /dj/, /kj/ palatalized to Albanian /s/, /z/, /c/:  →  'vice; worries';  →  'reason';  →  'ray; spoke'; faciēs →  'face, cheek';  →  'mate, comrade',  'husband', etc. In turn, Latin /s/ was altered to /ʃ/ in Albanian.

Haralambie Mihăescu demonstrated that:

 Some 85 Latin words have survived in Albanian but not (as inherited) in any Romance language. A few examples include Late Latin   → dial.  →  'hydra',  →  'winter pasture',  'used for packing, loading' →  'forked peg, grapnel, forked hanger',  'nightshade', lit. 'sun plant' →  'sunny place out of the wind, sunbathed area',  →  'spleen',  →  'pitchfork'.
 151 Albanian words of Latin origin were not inherited in Romanian. A few examples include Latin  → Albanian  'friend',  →  'foe, enemy',  → ,  → ,  'ploughman, herdsman' → ,  'peasant',  →  'drinking glass',  →  'castle',  →  'hundred',  →  'rooster',  →  'limb; joint',  →  'doctor',  →  'net',  → dial. ,  'to hope',  'to await',  →  'will; volunteer'.
 Some Albanian church terminology has phonetic features which demonstrate their very early borrowing from Latin.

Other authors have detected Latin loanwords in Albanian with an ancient sound pattern from the 1st century BC, for example, Albanian  'saddle girth; dwarf elder' from Latin  and Albanian  'old, aged; former' from  but influenced by Latin . The Romance languages inherited these words from Vulgar Latin:  became Romanian  'girdle; saddle girth', and Vulgar Latin veterānus  became Romanian  'old'.

Albanian, Basque, and the surviving Celtic languages such as Breton and Welsh are the non-Romance languages today that have this sort of extensive Latin element dating from ancient Roman times, which has undergone the sound changes associated with the languages. Other languages in or near the former Roman area either came on the scene later (Turkish, the Slavic languages, Arabic) or borrowed little from Latin despite coexisting with it (Greek, German), although German does have a few such ancient Latin loanwords ( 'window',  'cheese').

Romanian scholars such as Vatasescu and Mihaescu, using lexical analysis of the Albanian language, have concluded that Albanian was heavily influenced by an extinct Romance language that was distinct from both Romanian and Dalmatian. Because the Latin words common to only Romanian and Albanian are significantly fewer in number than those that are common to only Albanian and Western Romance, Mihaescu argues that the Albanian language evolved in a region with much greater contact with Western Romance regions than with Romanian-speaking regions, and located this region in present-day Albania, Kosovo and Western Macedonia, spanning east to Bitola and Pristina.

 Other loans 

After the Slavs arrived in the Balkans, the Slavic languages became an additional source of loanwords. The rise of the Ottoman Empire meant an influx of Turkish words; this also entailed the borrowing of Persian and Arabic words through Turkish. Some Turkish personal names, such as Altin, are common. There are some loanwords from Modern Greek, especially in the south of Albania. Many borrowed words have been replaced by words with Albanian roots or modern Latinised (international) words.

Gothic
Albanian is also known to possess a small set of loans from Gothic, with early inquiry into the matter done by Norbert Jokl and Sigmund Feist, though such loans had been claimed earlier in the 19th century by early linguists such as Gustav Meyer. Many words claimed as Gothic have now been attributed to other origins by later linguists of Albanian (fat and tufë, though used for major claims by Huld in 1994, are now attributed to Latin, for example), or may instead be native to Albanian, inherited from Proto-Indo-European. Today, it is accepted that there are a few words from Gothic in Albanian, but for the most part they are scanty because the Goths had few contacts with Balkan peoples.

Martin Huld defends the significance of the admittedly sparse Gothic loans for Albanian studies, however, arguing that Gothic is the only clearly post-Roman and "pre-Ottoman" language after Latin with a notable influence on the Albanian lexicon (the influence of Slavic languages is both pre-Ottoman and Ottoman). He argues that Gothic words in Albanian are attributable to the late fourth and early fifth centuries during the invasions of various Gothic speaking groups of the Balkans under Alaric, Odoacer, and Theodoric. He argues that Albanian Gothicisms bear evidence for the ordering of developments within Proto-Albanian at this time: for example, he argues Proto-Albanian at this stage had already shifted /uː/ to [y] as Gothic words with /uː/ reflect with /u/ in Albanian, not /y/ as seen in most Latin and ancient Greek loans, but had not yet experienced the shift of /t͡s/ to /θ/, since loans from Gothic words with /θ/ replace /θ/ with /t/ or another close sound.

Notable words that continue to be attributed to Gothic in Albanian by multiple modern sources include:

 tirk "felt gaiters, white felt" (cf Romanian tureac "top of boot") < Gothic *θiuh-brōks-Orel, Vladimir (1998). Albanian Etymological Dictionary. Page 456-7 or *θiuhbrōkeis, cf Old High German theobrach "gaiters"
 shkumë "foam" < Gothic *skūm-, perhaps via an intermediary in a Romance *scuma (cf. Romanian spumă)
 gardh "fence, garden" is either considered a native Albanian word  that was loaned into Romanian as gard zverk "nape, back of neck" < Gothic *swairhs; the "difficult" word having various otherwise been attributed (with phonological issues) to Celtic, Greek or native development.
 horr "villain, scoundrel" and horre "whore" < Gothic *hors "adulterer, cf Old Norse hóra "whore"
 punjashë "purse", diminutive of punjë < Gothic puggs "purse" (cf. Romanian pungă)

 Patterns in loaning 
Although Albanian is characterised by the absorption of many loans, even, in the case of Latin, reaching deep into the core vocabulary, certain semantic fields nevertheless remained more resistant. Terms pertaining to social organisation are often preserved, though not those pertaining to political organisation, while those pertaining to trade are all loaned or innovated.

Hydronyms present a complicated picture; the term for "sea" (det) is native and an "Albano-Germanic" innovation referring to the concept of depth, but a large amount of maritime vocabulary is loaned. Words referring to large streams and their banks tend to be loans, but lumë ("river") is native, as is rrymë (the flow of water). Words for smaller streams and stagnant pools of water are more often native, but the word for "pond", pellg is in fact a semantically shifted descendant of the old Greek word for "high sea", suggesting a change in location after Greek contact. Albanian has maintained since Proto-Indo-European a specific term referring to a riverside forest (gjazë), as well as its words for marshes. Curiously, Albanian has maintained native terms for "whirlpool", "water pit" and (aquatic) "deep place", leading Orel to speculate that the Albanian Urheimat likely had an excess of dangerous whirlpools and depths.

Regarding forests, words for most conifers and shrubs are native, as are the terms for "alder", "elm", "oak", "beech", and "linden", while "ash", "chestnut", "birch", "maple", "poplar", and "willow" are loans.

The original kinship terminology of Indo-European was radically reshaped; changes included a shift from "mother" to "sister", and were so thorough that only three terms retained their original function, the words for "son-in-law", "mother-in-law" and "father-in-law". All the words for second-degree blood kinship, including "aunt", "uncle", "nephew", "niece", and terms for grandchildren, are ancient loans from Latin.

The Proto-Albanians appear to have been cattle breeders given the vastness of preserved native vocabulary pertaining to cow breeding, milking and so forth, while words pertaining to dogs tend to be loaned. Many words concerning horses are preserved, but the word for horse itself is a Latin loan.

 See also 

 Abetare
 Arbëresh language
 Arvanitika 
 Gheg Albanian
 Illyrian language
 IPA/Albanian
 Messapic language
 Thraco-Illyrian
 Tosk Albanian

 Notes 

References

 Bibliography 

 Ajeti, Idriz. "La présence de l'albanais dans les parlers des populations slaves de la Péninsule balkanique à la lumière de la langue et de la toponymie", Studia Albanica 2 (1968): 131–6.
 Ajeti, Idriz. "Për historinë e marrëdhënieve të hershme gjuhësore shqiptare-sllave", Studime Filologjike 4 (1972): 83–94 (reprint in Gjurmime albanologjike – Seria e shkencave filologjike II – 1972. Pristina: 1974, pp. 33–44).
 Arapi, Inna. Der Gebrauch von Infinitiv und Konjunktiv im Altalbanischen mit Ausblick auf das Rumänische. Hamburg: Kovač, 2010.
 Banfi, Emanuele. Linguistica balcanica. Bologna: Zanichelli, 1985.
 Banfi, Emanuele. Storia linguistica del sud-est europeo: Crisi della Romània balcanica tra alto e basso medioevo. Milan: Franco Angeli, 1991.
 
 Bonnet, Guillaume. Les mots latins de l'albanais. Paris–Montréal: L'Harmattan, 1998.
 Bopp, Franz. "Über das Albanesische in seinen verwandtschaftlichen Beziehungen", in Königliche Preußische Akademie der Wissenschaften. Abhandlungen der philosophisch-historischen Klasse. Berlin: J. Stargardt, 1855, pp. 459–549.
 Boretzky, Norbert. Der türkische Einfluss auf das Albanische. 2 vols. vol. 1: Phonologie und Morphologie der albanischen Turzismen; vol. 2: Wörterbuch der albanischen Turzismen. Wiesbaden: Otto Harrassowitz, 1975.
 
 Çabej, Eqrem. "Disa probleme themelore të historisë së vjetër të gjuhës shqipe", Buletin i Universitetit Shtetëror të Tiranës. Seria e Shkencave Shoqërore 4 (1962): 117–148 (In German Studia Albanica 1 (1964))
 Çabej, Eqrem. "Zur Charakteristik der lateinischen Lehnwörter im Albanischen", Revue roumaine de linguistique 7, vol. 1 (1962): 161–99 (In Albanian "Karakteristikat e huazimeve latine të gjuhës shqipe", Studime Filologjike 2 (1974): 14–51)
 Çabej, Eqrem. "Rreth disa çështjeve të historisë së gjuhës shqipe", Buletin i Universitetit Shtetëror të Tiranës. Seria e Shkencave Shoqërore 3 (1963): 69–101. (In Romanian Studii și cercetări lingvistiche 4 (1954))
 Çabej, Eqrem. "Mbi disa rregulla të fonetikës historike të shqipes", Studime Filologjike 2 (1970): 77–95 (In German "Über einige Lautregeln des Albanischen", Die Sprache 18 (1972): 132–54)
 Çabej, Eqrem. "L'ancien nom national des albanais", Studia Albanica 1 (1972): 1–40.
 Çabej, Eqrem. "Problemi i vendit të formimit të gjuhës shqipe", Studime Filologjike 4 (1972): 3–27.
 Çabej, Eqrem. Studime etimologjike në fushë të shqipes. 7 vols. Tirana: Akademia et Shkencave e Republikës Popullore të Shqipërisë, Instituti i Gjuhësisë dhe i Letërsisë, 1976–2014.
 Camaj, Martin. Albanische Wortbildung. Wiesbaden: Otto Harrassowitz, 1966.
 Camaj, Martin. Albanian Grammar. Trans. Leonard Fox. Wiesbaden: Otto Harrassowitz, 1984.
 Camarda, Demetrio. Saggio di grammatologia comparata sulla lingua albanese. Livorno: Successore di Egisto Vignozzi, 1864.
 Camarda, Demetrio. Appendice al saggio di grammatologia comparata sulla lingua albanese. Prato, 1866.
 Campbell, George L., ed. Compendium of the World's Languages, 2nd edn. Vol. 1: Abaza to Kurdish, s.v. "Albanian". London–NY: Routledge, 2000, pp. 50–7.
 Cimochowski, Wacław. "Recherches sur l'histoire du sandhi dans la langue albanaise", Lingua Posnaniensis 2 (1950): 220–55.
 Cimochowski, Wacław. "Des recherches sur la toponomastique de l'Albanie", Lingua Posnaniensis 8 (1960): 133–45.
 Cimochowski, Wacław. "Pozicioni gjuhësor i ilirishtes ballkanike në rrethin e gjuhëve indoevropiane", Studime Filologjike 2 (1973).
 Coretta, Stefano; Riverin-Coutlée, Josiane; Kapia, Enkeleida; Nichols, Stephen. Northern Tosk Albanian (2022). Illustration of the IPA: Journal of the International Phonetic Association. pp. 1–23
 Demiraj, Bardhyl. Albanische Etymologien: Untersuchungen zum albanischen Erbwortschatz. Amsterdam–Atlanta: Rodopi, 1997.
 Demiraj, Shaban. "Albanian", in The Indo-European Languages. Edited by Anna Giacalone Ramat & Paolo Ramat. London-NY: Routledge, 1998, pp. 480–501.
 Demiraj, Shaban. Gramatikë historike e gjuhës shqipe. Tirana: 8 Nëntori, 1986.
 Demiraj, Shaban. Gjuha shqipe dhe historia e saj. Tirana: Shtëpia botuese e librit universitar, 1988.
 Demiraj, Shaban. Fonologjia historike e gjuhës shqipe. (Akademia e Shkencave e Shqiperise. Instituti i Gjuhesise dhe i Letersise). Tirana: TOENA, 1996.
 Demiraj, Shaban. Prejardhja e shqiptarëve në dritën e dëshmive të gjuhës shqipe. Tirana: Shkenca, 1999.

 De Simone, Carlo. "Gli illiri del Sud. Tentativo di una definizione", Iliria 1 (1986).
 Desnickaja, Agnija. Albanskij jazyk i ego dialekty. Leningrad: Nauka, 1968.
 Desnickaja, Agnija. "Language Interferences and Historical Dialectology", Linguistics 113 (1973): 41–57.
 Desnickaja, Agnija. Osnovy balkanskogo jazykoznanija. Leningrad: Nauka, 1990.
 de Vaan, Michiel. "The Phonology of Albanian", in Handbook of Comparative and Historical Indo-European Linguistics, vol. 3. Berlin/Boston: De Gruyter Mouton, 2018, pp. 1732–49.
 Domi, Mahir. "Prapashtesa ilire dhe shqipe, përkime dhe paralelizma", Studime Filologjike 4 (1974).
 Domi, Mahir. "Considérations sur les traits communs ou parallèles de l'albanais avec les autres langues balkaniques et sur leur étude", Studia Albanica 1 (1975).
 
 Genesin, Monica. "Albanian", in Encyclopedia of the Languages of Europe. Edited by Glanville Price. Oxford: Blackwell, 1998, pp. 4–8.
 Gjinari, Jorgji. "Për historinë e dialekteve të gjuhës shqipe", Studime Filologjike 4 (1968).
 Gjinari, Jorgji. "Mbi vazhdimësinë e ilirishtes në gjuhën shqipe", Studime Filologjike 3 (1969).
 Gjinari, Jorgji. "Struktura dialektore e shqipes e parë në lidhje me historinë e popullit", Studime Filologjike 3 (1976).
 Gjinari, Jorgji. "Dëshmi të historisë së gjuhës shqipe për kohën dhe vendin e formimit të popullit shqiptar", Studime Filologjike 3 (1982).
 Gjinari, Jorgji. Dialektologjia shqiptare. Pristina: Universiteti, 1970.
 Gjinari, Jorgji, Bahri Beci, Gjovalin Shkurtaj, & Xheladin Gosturani. Atlasi dialektologjik i gjuhës shqipe, vol. 1. Naples: Università degli Studi di Napoli L'Orientali, 2007.

 Hamp, Eric P. "Albanian", in Encyclopedia of Language and Linguistics. 2 vols. Edited by R. E. Asher. Oxford: Pergamon, 1994, pp. 1:65–7.
 Huld, Martin E. Basic Albanian Etymologies. Columbus, OH: Slavica Publishers, 1984.

 Katičić, Radoslav. Ancient Languages of the Balkans. 2 vols. The Hague–Paris: Mouton, 1976.
 Kocaqi, Altin. "Dokumente historiko-gjuhësore: vëndi i shqipes ndër gjuhët evropiane". Albania: Marin Barleti, 2013. . 
 
 Kretschmer, Paul. Einleitung in die Geschichte der griechischen Sprache. Göttingen, 1896.
 Kretschmer, Paul. "Sprachliche Vorgeschichte des Balkans", Revue internationale des études balkaniques 2, no. 1 (1935): 41–8.
 Lloshi, Xhevat. "Substandard Albanian and Its Relation to Standard Albanian", in Sprachlicher Standard und Substandard in Südosteuropa und Osteuropa: Beiträge zum Symposium vom 12.-16. Oktober 1992 in Berlin. Edited by Norbert Reiter, Uwe Hinrichs & Jirina van Leeuwen-Turnovcova. Berlin: Otto Harrassowitz, 1994, pp. 184–94.
 Lloshi, Xhevat. "Albanian", in Handbuch der Südosteuropa-Linguistik. Edited by Uwe Hinrichs. Wiesbaden: Otto Harrassowitz, 1999, pp. 277–99.
 
 Lambertz, Maximilian. Lehrgang des Albanischen. 3 vols., vol. 1: Albanisch-deutsches Wörterbuch; vol. 2: Albanische Chrestomathie; vol. 3: Grammatik der albanischen Sprache. Berlin: Deutscher Verlag der Wissenschaften 1954; Berlin 1955; Halle an der Saale 1959.
 
 Matzinger, Joachim. "Die Albaner als Nachkommen der Illyrier aus der Sicht der historischen Sprachwissenschaft", in Albanische Geschichte: Stand und Perspektiven der Forschung. Edited by Oliver Jens Schmitt & Eva Frantz. Munich: R. Oldenburg Verlag, 2009, pp. 13–35.
 Matzinger, Joachim. "Der lateinisch-albanische Sprachkontakt und seine Implikationen für Vorgeschichte des Albanischen und der Albaner", in Südosteuropäische Romania: Siedlungs-/Migrationsgeschichte und Sprachtypologie. Edited by Wolfgang Dahmen et al. Tübingen: Narr Verlag, 2012, pp. 75–103.
 Mayer, Anton. Die Sprache der alten Illyrier. 2 vols. Vienna: Österreichische Akademie der Wissenschaften, 1957/1959.
 Mann, Stuart E. An Albanian Historical Grammar. Hamburg: Helmut Buske, 1977.
 Meyer, Gustav. "Albanesische Studien I. Die Pluralbildungen der albanesischen Nomina", in Sitzungsberichte der philosophisch-historischen Classe der Kaiserlichen Akademie der Wissenschaften 104 (1883): 257–362.
 Miklosich, Franz. Albanische Forschungen. 2 vols., vol. 1: Die slavischen Elemente im Albanischen; vol. 2: Die romanischen Elemente im Albanischen. Vienna: Karl Gerold's Sohn, 1870.
 
 
 Newmark, Leonard, Philip Hubbard, & Peter Prifti. Standard Albanian: A Reference Grammar for Students. Stanford: Stanford University Press, 1982.
 Ölberg, Hermann. "Einige Uberlegungen zur Autochtonie der Albaner auf der Balkanhalbinsel", in Akten der internationalen albanologischen Kolloquiums, Innsbruck, 1972, zum Gedächtnis an Norbert Jokl. Edited by Hermann M. Ölberg. Innsbruck: Institut für Sprachwissenschaft der Universität Innsbruck, 1977.
 Ölberg, Hermann. "Kontributi i gjuhësisë për çështjen e atdheut ballkanik të shqiptarëve", Studime Filologjike 3 (1982).
 Pedersen, Holger. "Bidrag til den albanesiske Sproghistorie", in Festskrift til Vilhelm Tomsen. Kopenhagen: Gyldendal, 1894, pp. 246–57.
 Pedersen, Holger. "Albanesisch", Kritischer Jahrbericht 9, vol. 1 (1905): 206–17. Erlangen (1909).
 Pellegrini, Giovan Battista. "I rapporti linguistici interadriatici e l'elemento latino dell'albanese", Abruzzo 19 (1980): 31–71.
 Pellegrini, Giovan Battista. "Disa vëzhgime mbi elementin Latin të shqipes" [Some observations on the Latin element of the Albanian language], Studime Filologjike 3 (1982); (in Italian) "Alcune osservazioni sull'elemento latino dell'albanese", Studia Albanica 1983: 63–83.
 Pellegrini, Giovan Battista. Avviamento alla linguistica albanese. Edizione rinnovata. Rende: Università degli studi della Calabria, Centro editoriale e librario, 1997.
 Pisani, Vittore. "L'albanais et les autres langues indo-européennes", in Mélanges Henri Grégoire II. Brussels, 1950, pp. 519–38; reprint in Saggi di linguistica storica: Scritti scelti. Torino: Rosenberg & Sellier, 1959, pp. 96–114.
 Pisani, Vittore. "Les origines de la langue albanaise, questions de principe et de méthode", Studia Albanica 1 (1964): 61–8.
 Pisani, Vittore. "Sulla genesi dell'albanese", in Akten der internationalen albanologischen Kolloquiums, Innsbruck, 1972, zum Gedächtnis an Norbert Jokl. Edited by Hermann M. Ölberg. Innsbruck: Institut für Sprachwissenschaft der Universität Innsbruck, 1977, pp. 345–66.

 Orel, Vladimir. Albanian Etymological Dictionary. Leiden: Brill, 1998.
 
 Riza, Selman. Studime albanistike. Pristina 1979.
 
 Schumacher, Stefan & Joachim Matzinger. Die Verben des Altalbanischen: Belegwörterbuch, Vorgeschichte und Etymologie.  Wiesbaden: Otto Harrassowitz, 2013.
 Svane, Gunnar. Slavische Lehnwörter im Albanischen. Århus: Aarhus University Press, 1992.
 Tagliavini, Carlo. La stratificazione del lessico albanese: Elementi indoeuropei. Bologna: Casa editrice Prof. Riccardo Pàtron, 1965.
 Thumb, Albert. "Altgriechische Elemente des Albanesischen", Indogermanische Forschungen 26 (1909): 1–20.
 von Hahn, Johann Georg. Albanesische Studien. 3 vols. Jena: F. Mauko, 1854.
 Watkins, Calvert. "Proto-Indo-European: Comparison and Reconstruction", in The Indo-European Languages. Edited by Anna Giacalone Ramat & Paolo Ramat. London-NY: Routledge, 1998, pp. 25–73.
 Ylli, Xhelal. Das slawische Lehngut im Albanischen. 2 vols., vol. 1: Lehnwörter; vol. 2: Ortsnamen. Munich: Verlag Otto Sagner, 1997/2000.
 Ylli, Xhelal & Andrej N. Sobolev. Albanskii gegskii govor sela Muhurr''. Munich: Biblion Verlag, 2003.

External links 

 Albanian Online by Brian Joseph, Angelo Costanzo, and Jonathan Slocum, free online lessons at the Linguistics Research Center at the University of Texas at Austin
 glottothèque – Ancient Indo-European Grammars online, an online collection of introductory videos to Ancient Indo-European languages produced by the University of Göttingen

 
Languages attested from the 15th century
Indo-European languages
Illyrian languages
Languages of Albania
Languages of Greece
Languages of Italy
Languages of Kosovo
Languages of North Macedonia
Languages of Romania
Languages of Montenegro
Languages of Serbia
Languages of Sicily
Languages of Turkey
Subject–verb–object languages